Cutter is a fictional character from the G.I. Joe: A Real American Hero toyline, comic books and animated series. He is the G.I. Joe Team's hovercraft pilot and debuted in 1984.

Profile
His real name is Ronald "Skip" A. Stone, and his rank is that of Coast Guard lieutenant junior grade O-2. Cutter was born in Kinsley, Kansas.

Cutter's primary military specialty is hovercraft captain and his secondary military specialty is special services (he coached the women's swimming team at Annapolis). After trying unsuccessfully to get into Annapolis for two years, Cutter opted for the Coast Guard Academy at New London, Connecticut instead. Although his home town is in the central United States, Cutter always wanted a life at sea. When he found out the Joe Team had no members from the Coast Guard, he pressured the Coast Guard, until they pulled strings to get him on the team and out of their hair.

Cutter wears a cap similar to the one worn by the Boston Red Sox baseball team.

Toys
Cutter was first released as an action figure in 1984, packaged with the W.H.A.L.E. hovercraft. His hat sports the Red Sox logo. A new version of Cutter was released as an action figure in 1992, as part of the D.E.F. (Drug Elimination Force) line. The figure was repainted and released as part of the Battle Corps line in 1993, packaged with the "Shark 9000".

Comics

Marvel Comics

In the Marvel Comics G.I. Joe series, he first appeared in G.I. Joe: A Real American Hero #25 (July 1984) as the commander of the ship G.I.Jane. Cutter is injured later when Destro fires upon the Joe hovercraft, the 'W.H.A.L.E.' In the very next issue, Destro attacks on foot; Cutter is further injured when fighting him hand to hand. Despite this, he steals a boat to travel back to the 'Jane'. He continues leading the pursuit against Destro, who ultimately escapes.

He is a supporting character in the fourth yearbook, leading a surveillance team to spy on Cobra Island. The team comes into conflict with the Oktober Guard, who intend to kidnap Cobra Commander. They fail to do so, damaging their stolen Cobra Mamba in the process. Cutter negotiates the return of two captured Guard members for the damaged Mamba.

IDW Comics
Cutter was one of the fatalities in Storm Shadow's attack on the USS Flagg. He is impaled in the upper chest and uses this to deny Storm Shadow his sword.

Animated series

Sunbow
He first appeared in the G.I. Joe animated series in the second miniseries, "The Revenge of Cobra." He was portrayed as a cocky smart-aleck who continually got on the nerves of his teammates by tactlessly shooting off his mouth. Cutter was voiced by Gregg Berger in a slightly exaggerated Bostonian accent (despite the character's origins having him hail from the American Midwest).

G.I. Joe: The Movie
Cutter also briefly appeared in the 1987 animated film G.I. Joe: The Movie.

DiC
Cutter appeared again in the second season of the DiC G.I. Joe animated series, with no speaking roles.

References

External links
 Cutter at JMM's G.I. Joe Comics Home Page

Comics characters introduced in 1984
Fictional characters from Kansas
Fictional lieutenant commanders
Fictional lieutenants
Fictional ship captains
Fictional United States Coast Guard personnel
G.I. Joe soldiers
Male characters in animated series
Male characters in comics